The Bedfordshire Football Association, also simply known as Bedfordshire FA, is the governing body of football in the county of Bedfordshire, England. Founded in 1894, the Bedfordshire FA run a number of cups at different levels for teams across Bedfordshire.

History and Organisation

The Bedfordshire Football Association was founded in 1894 when an invitation was sent from  Mr. G.H. Barford of the Luton Town club to all clubs in the county to attend a meeting at the Cowper Arms Coffee Tavern in Luton.

On 18 January 1894 the ‘Luton News’ newspaper reported that the meeting was attended by "a good muster of young men representing the junior clubs and others interested in the welfare of football" who were in favour of a County Football Association being formed. One month later the association was officially formed and the first annual general meeting was held on 30 August of the same year, electing Mr G.H. Barford as the association's first president.

The Bedfordshire Football Association has been in existence for over 100 years and nowadays can claim a membership of over 300 clubs in Bedfordshire. The association has its own headquarters at Century House, Dunstable.

The Bedfordshire FA recognises that football development and improved governance of the game, including administration improvements, are essential in order that everyone who wants to can become involved in football.

Affiliated leagues

Men's Saturday Leagues
Spartan South Midlands League** 
Bedfordshire County League**

Footnote: **Part of the English football league system.

Small Sided Leagues
AGP Leagues – Bedfordshire FA
Bedford 6 a side League (Leisure Leagues)
Luton (Mundial)
Soccer PM League – Bedford

Men's Sunday Leagues
Bedford and District Sunday League 
North Home Counties Sunday League 
Leighton and District Sunday League

Ladies and Girls Leagues
Bedfordshire and Hertfordshire County Girls and Women's League

Youth Leagues
Chiltern Youth League
Bedfordshire Youth Saturday League 
Bedfordshire Mini Soccer League
Chiltern Junior Sevens
Mid Beds Mini League 
Dunstable and District Lower Schools League

Disbanded or Amalgamated Leagues

A number of leagues that were affiliated to the Bedfordshire County FA have disbanded or amalgamated with other leagues including:

Bedford and District League
Biggleswade and District League
Dunstable and District Youth League (amalgamated with the Luton and District Youth League to become the Chiltern Youth League)
Leighton and District League
Luton and District League
Luton and District Youth League (amalgamated with the Dunstable and District Youth League to become the Chiltern Youth League)
Luton Sunday League
South Beds Saturday League (now known as the Bedfordshire Youth Saturday League)

Affiliated Member Clubs

Among the notable clubs that are affiliated to the Bedfordshire County FA are:

AFC Dunstable
AFC Kempston Rovers
Ampthill Town
Arlesey Town
Barton Rovers
Bedford
Bedford Town

Biggleswade Town
Biggleswade United
Brache Sparta Community
Caddington
Cranfield United
Crawley Green Sports
Dunstable Town

Kent Athletic
Langford
Leighton Town
Luton Old Boys
Luton Town
Marston Shelton Rovers

Potton United
Shefford Town & Campton
Stotfold
The 61 FC (Luton)
Totternhoe
Wootton Blue Cross

County Cup Competitions

The Bedfordshire County FA run the following Cup Competitions:

Bedfordshire Premier Cup
Bedfordshire Senior Challenge Cup
Bedfordshire Senior Trophy
Bedfordshire Intermediate Challenge Cup
Bedfordshire Junior Challenge Cup
Bedfordshire Sunday Cup
Bedfordshire Sunday Junior Cup
Bedfordshire Sunday Lower Junior Cup

Bedfordshire Sunday Centenary Cup
Bedfordshire Inter-League Centenary Cup
Bedfordshire Women's County Cup
Bedfordshire Under 18 Floodlit Challenge Cup
Bedfordshire Under 18 Youth Challenge Cup
Bedfordshire Under 16 Youth Challenge Cup
Bedfordshire Under 15 Youth Challenge Cup

Bedfordshire Under 14 Youth Challenge Cup
Bedfordshire Tesco Under 13 Youth Challenge Cup
Bedfordshire Under 12 Youth Challenge Cup
Bedfordshire Senior Girls Development Cup
Bedfordshire Junior Girls Development Cup
Bedfordshire Girls Challenge Cup
Bedfordshire Junior Challenge Trophy

Source

List of recent Bedfordshire County Cup Winners

Source

2010–11 County Cup Winners

Source

External links
 Bedfordshire FA's official website

References

County football associations
Football in Bedfordshire
Organizations established in 1894